Priyadarshini Institute of Engineering and Technology (PIET) is a private engineering college under the  University of Nagpur, India.  It is located in Nagpur city, Mouza Shivangaon, Behind CRPF Campus, Hingna Road, Nagpur. The college was established in 1999. The principal is Dr. V. M. Nanoti. The college is run by Lokmanya tilak Jankalyan Shikshan Santha's Nagpur.

History
PIET was founded in 1999 by Dr. Satish Chaturvedi, a former Parliamentarian and a veteran state leader.

It started with unique branches, Chemical and Biotechnology and was affiliated to the Rashtrasant Tukadoji Maharaj Nagpur University. The college continued to progress rapidly and by 2001 had seven different departments and offered postgraduate programs as well.

Admission
Admission is done based on the score obtained in 12th standard or JEE Mains exams. 
Common admissions process conducted by Directorate of Technical Education is used to fill 80% seats of the institute.
40% of the CAP seats are reserved for OBC, SC, ST, VJ, NT (A), NT (B), NT (C), NT (D), SBC. 
To improve chances of a career in engineering for women, 30% of all the seats allocated for the common admissions process are reserved for women.

Departments 
The following departments for higher study and research have been in continuous operation since these were established:

References

Educational institutions established in 1999
Engineering colleges in Nagpur
Rashtrasant Tukadoji Maharaj Nagpur University
1999 establishments in Maharashtra